Baraeus gracilentus is a species of beetle in the family Cerambycidae. It was described by Stephan von Breuning in 1939. It is known from Tanzania.

References

Endemic fauna of Tanzania
Pteropliini
Beetles described in 1939